Liolaemus montanus, the mountain tree iguana, is a species of lizard in the family Iguanidae.  It is found in Argentina.

References

montanus
Lizards of South America
Reptiles of Argentina
Endemic fauna of Argentina
Reptiles described in 1898
Taxa named by Julio Germán Koslowsky